Pilgrim's Rest or Pilgrims Rest may refer to:

South Africa
 Pilgrim's Rest, Mpumalanga, a town

United States
 Pilgrims Rest, Alabama
 Pilgrim's Rest, Arkansas
 Pilgrim's Rest (Enterprise, Mississippi), listed on the NRHP in Mississippi
 Pilgrim's Rest (Nokesville, Virginia), listed on the NRHP in Virginia

Other
 Pilgrim's Rest (novel), a 1922 novel by the British writer Francis Brett Young
 Pilgrim's Rest (TV series), a sitcom shown on British TV